This is a list of countries by sector composition of the labor force, mostly based on The World Factbook.

* indicates "Labor in COUNTRY or TERRITORY" or "Economy of COUNTRY or TERRITORY" links.

Notes

Sector composition of the labor force